Mestri is from  Portuguese term 'mestre' meaning 'master', 'expert' or 'teacher'. It is also a common surname. Mestri may also refer to:

People 
Mestri (community), an artisan community of India

Media 
Muta Mestri, a 1993 Telugu film
Mesthri, a 2009 Telugu action film

Surname 
Guido del Mestri (1911-1993), cardinal of the Roman Catholic Church
Baburao Painter (Baburao Krishnarao Mestri), film director from India
Manikku Wadumestri Hendrick de Silva, 26th Attorney General of Sri Lanka